Henryk Petrich (born January 10, 1959 in Łódź, Łódź Voivodeship) is a former Polish amateur boxer, who won the Light Heavyweight bronze medal at the 1988 Seoul Olympic games. Petrich also won bronze medal at the 1986 World Championships in Reno and silver medal at the 1987 European Championships in Turin. He's eight-time Polish champion (1983-1986 in the middleweight division and 1987-1988, 1990-1991 in the light heavyweight division).

1988 Olympic Results 
Defeated Park Byun-Jin (South Korea) RSC 2
Defeated Niels Madsen (Denmark) 5-0
Defeated Ahmed El-Nagar (Egypt) 5-0
Lost to Andrew Maynard (United States) TKO 3

References
 

1959 births
Boxers at the 1988 Summer Olympics
Olympic bronze medalists for Poland
Olympic boxers of Poland
Living people
Sportspeople from Łódź
Olympic medalists in boxing
Polish male boxers
Medalists at the 1988 Summer Olympics
AIBA World Boxing Championships medalists
Light-heavyweight boxers
20th-century Polish people
21st-century Polish people